Candidates for the Liberal Party of Canada took part in all the 338 electoral districts in the 2015 Canadian federal election. 184 of them won their seat, giving Justin Trudeau's party an overall majority in the new House of Commons.

Candidate statistics

Newfoundland and Labrador - 7 seats

Prince Edward Island - 4 seats

Nova Scotia - 11 seats

New Brunswick - 10 seats

Quebec - 78 seats

Ontario - 121 seats

Manitoba - 14 Seats

Saskatchewan - 14 seats

Alberta - 34 seats

British Columbia - 42 seats

Yukon - 1 seat

Northwest Territories - 1 seat

Nunavut - 1 seat

See also
Results of the Canadian federal election, 2011
Results by riding for the Canadian federal election, 2011

References

External links
Liberal Party of Canada website

2015